Bincho, also known as Bincho Yakitori, was a London-based Japanese restaurant styled on the traditional izakayas found throughout Japan. Yakitori, literally translated as "grilled bird", is prepared on skewers and cooked over dense coals known as Bincho-tan made from oak.

History
David Miney, formerly of OXO Tower Restaurant and Rick Stein, had the idea of opening an izakaya in London whilst he was living in Tokyo in the late 1990s. Miney spent several years delving into the dingy late night izakaya scene, usually the traditional haunt of drunken salarymen and young Japanese hostesses. In 2007 he teamed up with Dominic Ford opened the flagship Bincho Yakitori at OXO Tower near Blackfriars on the banks of the River Thames. Experienced Yakitori Chef and Bincho Head Chef Hidenori Ohata was brought over from Japan in 2009 to help with the menu and expansion of the Bincho chain. Malcolm Simpson, originally from Australia who had been working in Tokyo restaurants for many years, was also brought over from Japan to manage the expanding chain.

Awards & reputation
 UK Telegraph Newspaper review
 UK Guardian Jay Rayner review
 UK Sunday Times AA Gill review

Locations

London/OXO Tower
Bincho OXO has a massive open-floor plan and seats around 140 covers. Opening in 2007, their OXO Tower flagship restaurant closed in early 2008.

London/Soho
Opening in 2008, Bincho opened a second location in the heart of London's theatre-land on Old Compton Street in Soho.

See also
 List of Japanese restaurants
 List of restaurants in London

References

External links 
 

Defunct Japanese restaurants
Japanese restaurants in London
Defunct restaurants in London
Restaurants established in 2007
British companies established in 2007